Nationality words link to articles with information on the nation's poetry or literature (for instance, Irish or France).

Events

January 20 – Chittadhar Hridaya begins a 6-year sentence of imprisonment in Kathmandu for writing poetry in Nepal Bhasa during which time he secretly composes his Buddhist epic Sugata Saurabha in the same language
Spring – The Antioch Review is founded as a literary magazine at Antioch College in Ohio
May 5 – Kingsley Amis and Philip Larkin meet while both reading English at St John's College, Oxford
August 18–19-year-old Pilot Officer John Gillespie Magee, Jr., American poet serving in Britain with the Royal Canadian Air Force (which he has joined before the United States has officially entered World War II), flies a high-altitude test flight in a Spitfire V from RAF Llandow in Wales and afterwards writes the sonnet "High Flight" about the experience (completed by September 3); on December 11 he dies in a collision over England
September 6–7 – Under Nazi occupation, Yiddish poet Abraham Sutzkever is among the Polish Jews interned in the Vilna Ghetto. He will escape and join the resistance in 1943. During the Nazi era, Sutzkever writes over 80 poems, whose manuscripts he manages to save for postwar publication
c. October – The first known reference to Babi Yar in poetry is written soon after the Babi Yar massacres by the young Jewish-Ukrainian poet from Kiev and an eyewitness, Liudmila Titova. Her poem "Babi Yar" will be discovered only in the 1990s
 December – During the Siege of Leningrad, Yakov Druskin, ill and starving, and Maria Malich, the second wife of Russian avant-garde poet Danil Kharms (arrested this summer on suspicion of treason and imprisoned in the psychiatric ward at Leningrad Prison No. 1 where he will die in 1942), trudge across the city to Kharms' bombed-out apartment building and collect a trunk full of manuscripts which they hide through the 1940s and 1950s, even bringing them to Siberia, then covertly show them to others in the 1960s. Their actions save much of Kharms' work for posterity as well as that of fellow poet Alexander Vvedensky (of whom only about a quarter of his output survives). Vvedensky, arrested in September in Kharkov for "counterrevolutionary agitation", was evacuated but died of pleurisy en route
 The surrealist magazine VVV is founded in New York City by French poet André Breton and Marcel Duchamp, Max Ernst and David Hare

Works published in English
Listed by nation where the work was first published and again by the poet's native land, if different; substantially revised works listed separately:

Canada
Anne Marriott, Calling Adventurers!, Toronto: Ryerson Press.
 E. J. Pratt, Dunkirk, Toronto: Macmillan.
 Bertram Warr, Yet a Little Onwards, Broadsheet No. 3, Resurgam Younger Poets series, Favil Press.

India, in English

 Sri Aurobindo, Poems ( Poetry in English ), Hyderabad: Government Central Press
 Bimal Chandra Bose, Thought-Ray ( Poetry in English ), Calcutta: Biman Panthi Publishing House
 Baldoon Dhingra, Comes Ever the Dawn ( Poetry in English ), Lahore: Ripon Press
 Manjeri Sundaraman, Brief Orisons ( Poetry in English ), Madras: Hurley Press
 Thurairajah Tambimuttu, editor, Out of This War ( Poetry in English ), London: Fortune Press; anthology; Indian poetry published in the United Kingdom 
 Hariprasad Sastri, editor and translator, Indian Mystic Verse, (3rd revised and enlarged edition 1984) anthology

United Kingdom
 W. H. Auden, New Year Letter (sometimes incorrectly called New Year Letters, with an "s"), May (published as The Double Man in the United States in March), English poet living in the United States
 Laurence Binyon, The North Star, and Other Poems
 Edmund Blunden, Poems 1930–1940
 Lilian Bowes Lyon, Tomorrow is a Revealing
 T. S. Eliot,  The Dry Salvages, published in New English Weekly, republished in Four Quartets, 1944
 A Choice of Kipling's Verse by T. S. Eliot, published December 1941
 G. S. Fraser, The Fatal Landscape and Other Poems
 Robert Greacen, The Bird, Northern Ireland poet
 J. F. Hendry and Henry Treece, editors, The White Horseman, poetry anthology featuring poets in the New Apocalyptics movement
 Louis MacNeice, Plant and Phantom
 John Pudney, "For Johnny"
 W. R. Rodgers, Awake! and Other Poems, Northern Ireland poet
 Alan Ross, Summer Thunder
 A. L. Rowse, Poems of a Decade
 Sydney Goodsir Smith, Skail Wind, in Scots and English
 Tambimuttu, editor, Out of This War, London: Fortune Press; anthology; Indian poetry in English, published in the United Kingdom
 Terence Tiller, Poems, New Hogarth Library 5
 Vernon Watkins, The Ballad of the Mari Lwyd, and Other Poems

United States
 W. H. Auden, The Double Man, published in March; later published as New Year Letter in the United Kingdom in May; English poet living in the United States
 Stephen Vincent Benet, A Summons to the Free
 John Peale Bishop, Selected Poems
 Louise Bogan, Poems and New Poems
 Paul Engle, West of Midnight
 Kenneth Fearing, Dagger of the Mind
 John Gould Fletcher, South Star
 Robinson Jeffers, Be Angry at the Sun
 Edgar Lee Masters, Illinois Poems
 Josephine Miles, Poems on Several Occasions
 Edna St. Vincent Millay, Collected Sonnets
 Marianne Moore, What Are Years
 John G. Neihardt, The Song of Jed Smith
 Carl Rakosi, Selected Poems
 John Crowe Ransom, The New Criticism, criticism
 Charles Reznikoff, Going To and Fro and Walking Up and Down, self-published
 Theodore Roethke, Open House
 Winfield Townley Scott, Wind the Clock
 Ridgely Torrence, Poems
 Mark Van Doren, The Mayfield Deer
 William Carlos Williams, The Broken Span
 Louis Zukofsky, 55 Poems

Other in English
 Allen Curnow, Island Time (Caxton), New Zealand
 Lesbia Harford (d. 1927), The Poems of Lesbia Harford, Australia
 Rex Ingamells and John Ingamells, At a Boundary, Adelaide, written by two brothers, includes Reginald Ingamells' "The Gangrened People", Australia
 Donagh MacDonagh, Veterans, and other poems, Ireland
 R. A. K. Mason, The Dark Will Lighten, New Zealand

Works published in other languages
Listed by nation where the work was first published and again by the poet's native land, if different; substantially revised works listed separately:

France
 Louis Aragon, Le Creve-Coeur
 Paul Éluard, pen name of Eugène Grindel, Le Livre ouvert, published from 1940 to this year
 Luc Estang, Puissance du matin
 Léon-Paul Fargue, Haute Solitude

Indian subcontinent
Including all of the British colonies that later became India, Pakistan, Bangladesh, Sri Lanka and Nepal. Listed alphabetically by first name, regardless of surname:

Hindi
 Girija Kumar Mathur, Manjir, Indian, Hindi
 Sumitra Kumari Sinha, Vihag, Hindi
 Syed Kalbe Mustapha, Malik Muhammad Ja'isi, biography in Urdu of Malik Mohammad Jaisi, a Hindi poet of the 15th century, with descriptions of the poet's works

Other languages on the Indian subcontinent
 Abanindranath Tagore and Rani Chanda, a memoir describing the lives of the family that included Rabindranath Tagore; a companion volume to Joda Sakor Dhare 1944 and Apan Katha 1946; Bengali
 Ananta Pattanayak, Tarpana Kare Aji, Indian, Oriya-language
 Baidyanath Mishra, also known as "Yatri", a dramatic monologue given by a child-widow character, told in colloquial language, a new development in Maithili poetry
 Bawa Balwant, Maha Nac, Punjabi-language poems inspired by Marxist and left-leaning politics
 Darshan Singh Awara, Main Bagi Han, Punjabi-language poems reflecting anger toward society as well as religious traditions and institutions
 Dimbeswar Neog, Svahid Karbala, Assamese-language narrative poem on a tragedy at Karbala and the martyrdom of Hussain
 Jyotsna Shukla, Akashnan Phool, Indian poet writing in Gujarati
 Faiz Ahmad Faiz, Naqsh-e-Faryadi, Indian, Urdu-language
 Hari Daryani, Hariscandra Jivana Katha, Sindhi-language (India)
 M. U. Malkani, Gitanjali, translation into Sindhi from the English of Rabindranath Thakur's book of the same name
 Mohammad Mumtaz Ali, Amir Minasi, biography of the Urdu poet Amir Minai (1828–1900), including descriptions of Minai's works; written in Urdu
 Narayan Bezbarua, Sakti Singa, Indian, Assamese
 Pritam Singh Safir, Kattak Kunjam, Indian, Punjabi-language
 Sri Chandra Singh, "Vadali", a Rajasthani-language nature poem in 130 verses which influenced Rajasthani poets for a generation
 Wahab Pare of Hajin, Kashmiri Shahnama Firdosi, an adaptation in Kashmiri of the Persian classic poem by Firdousi; with a canto added at the end

Spanish language
 José Santos Chocano, Oro de Indias, Peru
 Gerardo Diego, Alondra de verdad ("True Lark"), 42 sonnets on diverse topics; Spain
 Federico García Lorca, Diván del Tamarit (Spanish for "The Diván of Tamarit", written in 1936, published posthumously this year; Spain
 Gabriela Mistral, Antología: Selección de Gabriela Mistral, Santiago, Chile: Zig Zag

Other
 Amir Hamzah, Buah Rindu, Dutch East Indies
 Pier Paolo Pasolini, Versi a Casarsa, Friulian poetry published in Italy
 Nima Yooshij, "Quqnūs", Iran

Awards and honors

 Governor General's Award, poetry or drama: Calling Adventurers, Anne Marriott (Canada)

United States
 Frost Medal: Robert Frost
 Pulitzer Prize for Poetry: Leonard Bacon: Sunderland Capture

Births
Death years link to the corresponding "[year] in poetry" article:
 February 7 – Kevin Crossley-Holland, English poet and children's author
 February 19 – Stephen Dobyns, American poet and novelist
 March 1 – Robert Hass, American poet
 March 13 – Mahmoud Darwish (died 2008), Palestinian poet
 March 21 – Abdulla Oripov (died 2016), Uzbek poet and statesman
 March 22 – Billy Collins, American poet who served two terms as the 44th Poet Laureate of the United States (2001–2003)
 April 12 – Toi Derricotte, American poet
 April 18 – Michael D. Higgins, Irish President, academic and poet
 April 29 (probable date) – Yusef Komunyakaa, American poet, academic and recipient of the 1994 Kingsley Tufts Poetry Award and 1995 Pulitzer Prize for Poetry
 May 17 – Lyn Hejinian, American poet, essayist, translator and publisher often associated with the Language poets
 May 24 – Bob Dylan (Robert Allen Zimmerman), American singer-songwriter and recipient of the 2016 Nobel Prize in Literature
 May 27 – Simon J. Ortiz, Native American poet and writer associated with the Native American Renaissance
 August 4 – Robert Grenier, American poet essayist, and editor often associated with the Language poets
 September 1 – Gwendolyn MacEwen (died 1987), Canadian novelist and poet
 September 15 – Lindsay Barrett, Jamaican novelist, poet and journalist
 October 2 – John Sinclair, American poet jailed in 1969 after selling two joints to undercover narcotics officers; in 1971 his case receives international attention when John Lennon performs at a benefit concert on his behalf
 October 13 – John Snow, English cricketer and poet
 October 20 – Stewart Parker (died 1988), Northern Irish poet and playwright
 October 27 – Rodolfo Hinostroza (died 2016), Peruvian poet, writer, journalist, food critic and astrologer
 November 8 – David MacLeod Black, South African-born Scots poet
 November 15 – Heathcote Williams (died 2017), English poet, political activist, film actor and dramatist
 November 23 – Derek Mahon (died 2020), Irish poet
 November 29 – Lloyd Schwartz, American poet
 December 14 – Rachel Blau DuPlessis, American poet, essayist, critic and academic
 December 16 – Poldy Bird (died 2018), Argentinian poet
 date not known:
 Jonathan Holden, American poet and academic
 Jeremy Hooker, English poet, critic, lecturer and broadcaster
 John Mole, English poet
 William Pitt Root, American poet
 Gibbons Ruark, American poet
 Stephen Yenser, American poet

Deaths
Birth years link to the corresponding "[year] in poetry" article:
 January 6 – F. R. Higgins (born 1896), Irish poet
 January 13 – James Joyce, 58 (born 1882), Irish novelist and poet
 January 23 – John Oxenham (William Arthur Dunkerley, born 1852), English novelist and poet
 February 5 – A. B. (`Banjo') Paterson (born 1864), Australian bush poet, journalist and author
 March 13 – Elizabeth Madox Roberts (born 1880), American novelist and poet
 May 2 – Ibrahim Touqan إبراهيم طوقان (born 1905), Palestinian, Arab-language poet
 May 19 – Lola Ridge (born 1873), American anarchist poet, editor of avant-garde, feminist and Marxist publications
 June 15 – Evelyn Underhill (born 1875), English poet
 August 7 – Rabindranath Tagore, 80 (born 1861), Bengali poet in India, Brahmo Samaj (syncretic Hindu monotheist) philosopher, visual artist, playwright, composer and novelist whose works reshaped Bengali literature and music in the late 19th and early 20th centuries (1913 winner of the Nobel Prize in Literature)
 August 31 – Marina Tsvetaeva (born 1892), Soviet Russian poet, suicide by hanging
 September 1 – Jiří Orten (born 1919), Czech poet
 c. October? – Alexander Vvedensky (born 1904), Russian poet (see Events section above)
 October 1 – Aline Murray Kilmer (born 1888), American poet and children's writer
 October 16 – Sergei Efron (born 1893), Soviet Russian poet and secret police operative, executed
 October 17 – May Ziadeh (born 1886), Lebanese-Palestinian poet, essayist and translator
 November 18 – Émile Nelligan (born 1879), Canadian French language poet

See also

 Poetry
 List of poetry awards
 List of years in poetry

Notes

20th-century poetry

Poetry